The 1929 International Cross Country Championships was held in Vincennes, France, at the Hippodrome de Vincennes on March 23, 1929.  This was the first appearance of teams from Italy, Luxembourg, Spain, and Switzerland.  A report on the event was given in the Glasgow Herald.

Complete results, medallists, 
 and the results of British athletes were published.

Medallists

Individual Race Results

Men's (8.7 mi / 14.0 km)

Team Results

Men's

Participation
An unofficial count yields the participation of 90 athletes from 10 countries.

 (9)
 (9)
 (9)
 (9)
 (9)
 (9)
 (9)
 (9)
 (9)
 (9)

See also
 1929 in athletics (track and field)

References

International Cross Country Championships
International Cross Country Championships
Cross
International Cross Country Championships
International Cross Country Championships
Cross country running in France